Full of Hell is an American grindcore band from Ocean City, Maryland, and Central Pennsylvania, formed in 2009. They are currently signed to Relapse Records and have released five studio albums – Roots of Earth Are Consuming My Home (2011), Rudiments of Mutilation (2013), Trumpeting Ecstasy (2017), Weeping Choir (2019), and Garden of Burning Apparitions (2021) – as well as several EPs and splits. In addition to studio albums, they've released three collaboration albums – Full of Hell & Merzbow (2014) with Japanese noise artist Merzbow, and One Day You Will Ache Like I Ache (2016) and Ascending a Mountain of Heavy Light (2017) with sludge metal band The Body – with a fourth, Suffocating Hallucination with doom metal band Primitive Man, due in March 2023.

History
The band formed in 2009, having signed to A389 Recordings and Profound Lore Records in their first few years, releasing three full-length albums: Roots of Earth Are Consuming My Home in 2011, Rudiments of Mutilation in 2013, and Full of Hell & Merzbow, a collaboration with Japanese noise artist Merzbow, in 2014.

In 2015, original bassist Brandon Brown left the band. He was replaced by Sam DiGristine of Jarhead Fertilizer—an associated act that also features Brown, as well as drummer Dave Bland. Dylan Walker and Spencer Hazard follow a straight edge lifestyle, while Bland is the only vegan.

On January 8, 2016, Full of Hell released a four-song EP titled Amber Mote in the Black Vault through Bad Teeth Recordings. The release featured three original tracks and a cover of Melvins' track "Oven," originally released on their 1989 album Ozma. Describing their reasoning for selecting this track, the band explained: "We had been wanting to cover a Melvins song for years, and 'Oven' had always been one of our top choices. We've always been very inspired by the Melvins on every level—a totally unique and uncompromising band that has always worked their asses off. They are a band that's undefinable but always recognizable. Totally brilliant. With past covers that we've done, we've always deviated from the source material, but this time we chose to stick close to the original sound and tempo."

Full of Hell began plotting to follow up Full of Hell & Merzbow with another collaborative album with avant-garde metal band The Body after a successful 2015 tour together. The two acts expected to head into the studio together to record an album without previously writing any material. Titled One Day You Will Ache Like I Ache, the collaboration album was released on March 25, 2016 through Neurot Recordings—a label founded by members of Neurosis and Tribes of Neurot.

Full of Hell's fifth studio album, Trumpeting Ecstasy was released on May 5, 2017. The album was ranked number 4 on Exclaim!'s Top 10 Metal and Hardcore Albums of 2017.

On February 13, 2018, the band announced that they had signed to Relapse Records.

Members

Current
 Dylan Walker – lead vocals, electronics, noise (2009–present)
 Spencer Hazard – guitars, noise (2009–present)
 Dave Bland – drums (2009–present)
 Sam DiGristine – bass, backing vocals (2015–present)

Former
 Brandon Brown – bass, backing vocals (2009–2015)

Discography

Studio albums
 Roots of Earth Are Consuming My Home (2011)
 Rudiments of Mutilation (2013)
 Trumpeting Ecstasy (2017)
 Weeping Choir (2019)
 Garden of Burning Apparitions (2021)

Collaborative albums 

Full of Hell & Merzbow (collaboration with Merzbow) (2014)
One Day You Will Ache Like I Ache (collaboration with The Body) (2016)
Ascending a Mountain of Heavy Light (collaboration with The Body) (2017)
Suffocating Hallucination (collaboration with Primitive Man) (2023)

EPs
 Savage (2009)
 The Inevitable Fear of Existence (2010)
 F.O.H. Noise (2011)
 F.O.H. Noise: Vol. 2 (2011)
 F.O.H. Noise: Vol. 3 (2012)
 F.O.H. Noise: Vol. 4 (2013)
 Amber Mote in the Black Vault (2015)
 Live at Roadburn (2016)
 Aurora Leaking from an Open Wound (2022)

Splits
 Full of Hell / Goldust (2011)
 Full of Hell / Code Orange Kids (2012)
 Full of Hell / Calm the Fire (2012)
 Full of Hell / The Guilt Of... (2012)
 Full of Hell / Psywarfare (2014)
 Nails / Full of Hell (2016)
 Full of Hell / Intensive Care (2018)

References

External links
 

Musical groups established in 2009
2009 establishments in Maryland
2009 establishments in Pennsylvania
American grindcore musical groups
Powerviolence groups
American sludge metal musical groups
American doom metal musical groups
Noise musical groups
American experimental musical groups
American experimental rock groups
Hardcore punk groups from Maryland
Hardcore punk groups from Pennsylvania
Heavy metal musical groups from Maryland
Heavy metal musical groups from Pennsylvania
Musical quintets
Profound Lore Records artists
Relapse Records artists